Gradište is a village and municipality in the Vukovar-Syrmia County in Croatia. According to the 2011 census, there are 2,773 inhabitants, 98.40% which are Croats.

It is located just west of the route D55 between Vinkovci and Županja.

See also
 Spačva basin

References

Municipalities of Croatia
Populated places in Syrmia
Populated places in Vukovar-Syrmia County